Cobra Verde (also known as Slave Coast) is a 1987 German drama film directed by Werner Herzog and starring Klaus Kinski, in their fifth and final collaboration. Based upon Bruce Chatwin's 1980 novel The Viceroy of Ouidah, the film depicts the life of a fictional slave trader who travels to the West African kingdom of Dahomey. It was filmed on location in Brazil, Colombia and Ghana.

Plot
In the late 19th century, Francisco Manoel da Silva (Klaus Kinski) is a debauched Brazilian rancher who has reluctantly gone to work at a gold mining company after his ranch is ruined by drought. When he discovers that he is being financially exploited, he murders his boss and goes on the lam to pursue a career as an outlaw. He becomes the notorious Cobra Verde (Green Snake), the most vicious bandit of the sertão.

In a visit to town, da Silva encounters and subdues by force of character an escaping slave, an act that impresses wealthy sugar baron Dom Octávio Coutinho (José Lewgoy). Dom Coutinho, unaware that he is dealing with the legendary bandit, hires da Silva to oversee the slaves on his sugar plantation. When da Silva subsequently impregnates all three of the Dom's daughters, the sugar baron is furious, but the situation becomes even more complicated when he discovers that da Silva is none other than the infamous Cobra Verde.

As punishment, rather than kill him or have him prosecuted, Dom Coutinho decides to send da Silva on the impossible mission of re-opening the slave trade with Western Africa. The bandit is aware he is likely to be killed in Africa, but accepts anyway. He travels by sea to Dahomey, West Africa (present-day Benin), where he must negotiate with the fearsome King Bossa Ahadee of Dahomey (played by His Honour the Omanhene Nana Agyefi Kwame II of Nsein, a village north of the city of Axim, Ghana).

Amazingly, da Silva succeeds in convincing the King to exchange slaves for new rifles. He takes over Elmina Castle and takes Taparica (King Ampaw), sole survivor of the previous expedition, for a partner. They begin operating the slave trade across the Atlantic to Brazil. Soon, however, the fickle king has them captured and brought before him. The King accuses da Silva of various crimes that he has no knowledge of, including poisoning the King's greyhound, and sentences him to death. He and Taparica are rescued the night prior to da Silva's decapitation by the King's nephew, who negotiates a blood alliance with da Silva, planning to overthrow the King. The ambitious bandit trains an enormous army of native women (who, after learning to use weapons, at first want to kill all men) and leads them on a raid to successfully overthrow King Bossa.

Against all expectations, the slave trade is maintained under the new king, thanks to da Silva's resourcefulness. However, da Silva eventually falls out of favour with the new King, and discovers that in the meantime the Portuguese have outlawed slavery and seized his assets, and the British have placed a price on his head. Despite the adversity, da Silva is glad that finally a change has come and recognises that slavery has been a crime. The exhausted bandit goes onto the beach at Elmina and desperately tries to pull a ship's boat to water, but he collapses in the surf as the tide slowly comes in and a crippled African man walks on all fours toward him along the shore.  The film ends with a group of confident young African women laughingly chanting over the credits.

Cast 
 Klaus Kinski – Francisco Manoel da Silva
 King Ampaw – Taparica
 José Lewgoy – Don Octavio Coutinho
 Salvatore Basile – Captain Fraternidade
 Peter Berling – Bernabé

Production
The film was shot in Ghana, Brazil and Colombia. Herzog showed Kinski photographs of the places where he would like to work. Kinski was interested in some landscapes in Colombia, but Herzog did not agree. However, Kinski made the trip with a group of friends to some remote places that fascinated him: the foothills of the Sierra Nevada de Santa Marta and the Cape of the Sailing, on the peninsula of La Guajira, Colombia. Herzog finally decided on Villa de Leyva and Valle del Cauca, in the South American country. Kinski said then: "Herzog does not know that I give life to the dead scenery."

The film was based upon Bruce Chatwin's 1980 novel The Viceroy of Ouidah, which was itself based on the Brazilian slave trader Francisco Félix de Sousa and his role in helping King Ghezo overthrow his brother Adandozan as King of Dahomey with the help of Ghezo's Dahomey Amazons. Herzog approached Chatwin about adapting his work into a film, but after learning that David Bowie had also expressed interest in adapting it to a feature, Herzog raced to acquire the rights and begin production.

Tension between Herzog and Kinski
Cobra Verde was the last film that Werner Herzog would make with Klaus Kinski. Their now-legendary personality conflict peaked during the film. The film's production was especially affected by Kinski's fiery outbursts. The cast and crew were continually plagued by Kinski's wrath, most famously culminating in the film's original cinematographer Thomas Mauch walking out on the project after a perpetual torrent of verbal abuse from Kinski. Herzog was forced to replace Mauch with Viktor Růžička.

Herzog's opinions of Kinski are deeply explored in his 1999 documentary retrospective, My Best Fiend, where he examines their unique friendship, the associated hatred, and the legacy that both qualities were responsible for. The filming of Cobra Verde and relationship of Herzog and Kinski was also the subject of a 1987 Swiss documentary film, Location Africa.

References

External links
 
 
 

1987 films
1980s adventure drama films
German adventure drama films
West German films
1980s German-language films
Films directed by Werner Herzog
Films based on British novels
Films scored by Popol Vuh (band)
Films set in Africa
Films set in the 19th century
Films shot in Colombia
Films about slavery
Films shot in Benin
Films shot in Ghana
Films shot in Brazil
1987 drama films
1980s German films